Acheronodon is a genus of herbivorous arboreal mammal which belongs to the family Microcosmodontidae and which was endemic to North America during the Early Paleocene subepoch (66—56.8 mya) and in existence for approximately .

It is a member of the extinct order Multituberculata and lies within the suborder Cimolodonta.

The species Acheronodon garbani is known from fossils found in the Puercan (Paleocene)-age formations of Tullock Formation in Montana (United States) and possible specimens from the Porcupine Hills in Alberta, Canada. The holotype was found in Montana.

References 

 Archibald (1982), "A study of Mammalia and geology across the Cretaceous-Tertiary boundary in Garfield County, Montana." Univ. Calif. Publ. Geol. Sci. 122, p. 1-286.
 Kielan-Jaworowska Z & Hurum JH (2001), "Phylogeny and Systematics of multituberculate mammals." Paleontology 44, p. 389-429.
 Much of this information has been derived from Eucosmodontidae, Microcosmodontidae and Taeniolabidoidea, an Internet directory.

Cimolodonts
Paleocene mammals
Paleocene genus extinctions
Paleocene mammals of North America
Prehistoric mammal genera